Vanan (also Romanized as Venen) is a village in Khvoresh Rostam-e Shomali Rural District, Khvoresh Rostam District, Khalkhal County, Ardabil Province, Iran. At the 2006 census, its population was 18, in 6 families.

References 

Vanan page at Tageo.com

Towns and villages in Khalkhal County